The Andros Trophy (Trophée Andros) is the French national ice racing championship.

History

The idea of an ice racing series first became an idea when professional racer Max Mamers (French Rallycross Champion 1982 and 1983 with Talbot Matra Murena) and the owner of the Andros company (jam and compote producers), Frédéric Gervoson, met as rugby fans in 1985. They spent the winter racing with friends on ice circuits.

On 27 January 1990, the idea of a series came to life at Serre Chevalier with the first round of four.

The series quickly grew, with a round at Paris (Pelouse de Reuilly) in 1991 creating a five round series; and a seven round championship in 1992.

In 2003, the trophy gained an international aspect with a race at Sherbrooke in Canada, a race that was held for three seasons. For the 2005/06 season, the trophy remained mainly national, the exception being one round held in Andorra.

The current series

The series now runs with a number of different races and classes.

Elite Pro Class
This is the original and highest class, featuring the most prominent names.

Elite Class
Starting in 1994 (named Promotion), this class is for the smaller teams, encouraging them to take part in the Trophée Andros. To partake in this class, there are three conditions: the drivers cannot have finished in the top 20 over the general classification; must never have participated in the Elite Pro Class; and cannot be a professional driver.

AMV Cup
The motorbike races for the Andros Trophy first appeared at the 1996 championship final at Super Besse, after an idea of Mamers and Claude Michy. It became a series in its own right in the 1997/98 season with a race at every round from that point.

Trophée Andros Féminin - Sprint Cars
Created in 2002, this series combined two categories. The 600cc 6-speed buggy-styled car was shared between a female driver and an experienced driver, who also was the instructor for the female driver. They competed in two different races at each weekend they attended. The Féminin trophy was discontinued as of 2011, with some of the female drivers from the series moving into other categories of the trophée including the main series and the electric cars.

Famous names
The driver with the most championship wins in the history of the series is Yvan Muller, who has won the championship 10 times with 48 race victories. Jean-Philippe Dayraut holds the record for the most race victories with 54, having taken the championship 6 times. Another multiple championship winner is Alain Prost, with 3 championships and 38 race wins.

The series always attracts names who were famous in other series before moving to ice racing – including Formula One drivers Olivier Panis, Romain Grosjean and Jacques Villeneuve.

The "Superfinal"
On 14 February 1999, the series held a "Superfinal" at the Stade de France in Saint-Denis, on the outskirts of Paris. Using 700 tonnes of ice, an oval track was established around the edge of the stadium, allowing for racing in front of around 60,000 people, with no championship points at stake.

The Superfinal was held at the Stade de France for three years, before moving to an oval track at Nœux-les-Mines in 2002. No Superfinal was held in 2003, but returned to the Stade de France in 2004.

In 2005 the races were held at Saint-Dié-des-Vosges, and once again at the Stade de France in 2006, 2008 and 2011. Various other locations have been used, but in recent years the Superfinal was almost always raced at Clermont / Super Besse.

Trophy winners

The title for the dame was awarded in to best women in a selected class in each season.

References

External links

Official Website 

Auto racing series in France
Motorcycle racing series
Rally racing series